René Rottenfluc (19 December 1900 – 8 April 1962) was a French wrestler. He competed at the 1924 and 1928 Summer Olympics.

References

External links
 

1900 births
1962 deaths
Olympic wrestlers of France
Wrestlers at the 1924 Summer Olympics
Wrestlers at the 1928 Summer Olympics
French male sport wrestlers
Sportspeople from Calvados (department)